The Sables et Grès a Trigonia gibbosa is a geological formation in northwestern France. It dates back to the Late Jurassic.

Vertebrate fauna

Ornithischians

Saurischians

See also 
 List of dinosaur-bearing rock formations

References 

Geologic formations of France
Jurassic System of Europe
Tithonian Stage
Sandstone formations